The 1997 FIFA World Player of the Year award was won by Ronaldo, who became the first player to win the award two years in a row. The ceremony took place at the Disneyland Paris, on January 12, 1998. 121 national team coaches, based on the current FIFA Men's World Ranking were chosen to vote. It was organised by European Sports Media, Adidas and FIFA.

Results

References

See also

FIFA World Player of the Year
FIFA World Player of the Year